Ochterlony or Ouchterlony may refer to:

Ouchterlony Valley, or O' Valley, a town in Gudalur Taluk, Nilgiris district, Tamil Nadu, India

People with the surname

Ochterlony
David Ochterlony (1758–1825), Massachusetts-born general of the East India Company in British India
David Ochterlony Dyce Sombre (1808–1851), an Anglo-Indian held to be the first person of Asian descent to be elected to the British Parliament
John Ochterlony (1667–1742), Anglican clergyman in the Scottish Episcopal Church and Bishop of Brechin
Matthew Ochterlony (1880–1946), Scottish peer and architect
Robert Ochterlony, Anglican Dean of Brechin in the 1720s

Ouchterlony
Örjan Ouchterlony (1914–2004), Swedish bacteriologist and immunologist

See also
Ochterlony baronets and the Ochterlony Baronetcy, two titles in the Baronetage of the United Kingdom
Ochterlony Monument or Shaheed Minar, a monument in Kolkata. India
Ouchterlony double immunodiffusion, an immunological technique named after Örjan Ouchterlony